"Love Is Like a Rock" is a song by American rock musician Donnie Iris from his 1981 album King Cool. The song was released as the second single from his second album.

The song reached No. 37 on the U.S. Billboard Hot 100 chart and No. 9 on the U.S. Billboard Mainstream Rock Tracks chart.  The song was also recorded by Slade on their 1987 album You Boyz Make Big Noize.

"Love is Like a Rock" is often used by the Slippery Rock University of Pennsylvania band during football games. Iris attended SRU in the early 1960s.

Composition

In a September 2006 interview with Songfacts, Iris explained the song's origins:

Chart performance

Weekly charts

Year-end charts

Slade version
English rock band Slade recorded a version of the song for their fourteenth studio album You Boyz Make Big Noize, released in 1987. The band's bassist Jim Lea had heard the song and thought the song suited Slade and their style. He also felt it would fit with the commercial rock sound of the time. The song was recorded at Wessex Studios and was one of two tracks from the album to be produced by Roy Thomas Baker. In a 1987 fan club interview, guitarist Dave Hill said of the song: "This track is a cover of an American song which Jim thought sounded a bit like us in its original format. Jim suggested that it would fit in nicely to the current mould of Bon Jovi/Europe. Roy also liked the song, so we got him to produce it. It's got an up-tempo American feel to it."

Critical reception
In a review of You Boyz Make Big Noize, an American review from Guitar magazine highlighted "Love Is Like a Rock" as one of three of the album's 'hot spots' and stated "No one will ever mistake this for compositional brilliance, but Slade's consistent ability to suck you into their friendly carousing is impressive. It starts with the muscular riff of "Love Is Like a Rock" and never lets up through raspy Holder chorus after chorus." Doug Stone of AllMusic said in a retrospective review of the album: "The raging opener "Love Is Like a Rock," didn't fare any better commercially for the boyz than the tune did for awesome originators Donnie Iris and the Cruisers; this class cut remains an ace way to kick off the album because "Love" is, like, so Slade in the first place." Stone also highlighted the song as an album standout by labeling it an AMG Pick Track. In the album's 2007 Salvo remaster liner notes, writer Chris Ingham said: ""Love Is Like a Rock" is a telling observation about Slade's ongoing quest to style themselves to the times. One of several more obvious candidates for a single than the tracks that were actually chosen, it nevertheless kicks off the record in great rambunctious style."

References

External links
Lyrics of this song
 

Donnie Iris songs
Slade songs
1981 songs
Songs written by Mark Avsec
Songs written by Donnie Iris
1981 singles
1982 singles
MCA Records singles